Claudia Morales may refer to: 

 Claudia Morales (journalist) (born 1969), Colombian journalist and broadcaster
 Claudia Morales (actress) (born 1992), Venezuelan actress, model, and singer